Der Nachtkurier meldet… is a German bi-weekly television series that aired 42 episodes on SDR from October 31, 1964 to July 23, 1966.

Cast 
 Gig Malzacher: Günther Wieland, a young reporter for the newspaper Der Nachtkurier
 Ernst Konstantin: editor-in-chief Wendlberger
 Willy Semmelrogge: police inspector Stegemann
 Gerd Potyka: photographer Charly Renzmann

List of episodes

1964

1965

1966

References

External links 
 

German drama television series
1964 German television series debuts
1966 German television series endings
Television series about journalism
Television shows set in Munich
German-language television shows
Das Erste original programming